Kenneth Owen Roberts (27 March 1936 – 6 February 2021) was a Welsh professional footballer who played as a winger with Wrexham and Aston Villa. He later achieved managerial success with Chester.

Playing career
Roberts made his Football League debut for Wrexham in 1951, when aged just 15 years and 158 days old, equalling the 1929 record of Bradford Park Avenue's Albert Geldard for the youngest League player. This record stood until beaten by Reuben Noble-Lazarus of Barnsley in 2008.

He later joined Aston Villa and added 38 league outings and three goals to his tally.

Managerial career
Roberts became manager of Chester in March 1968, and remained in charge until September 1976 when he became general manager. The highlight of this reign came in 1974–75, when Chester reached the Football League Cup semi-finals and won promotion from Division Four.

He later returned to the dugout as manager of Oswestry Town in 1983, spending a year in the role. He also coached at Wrexham and Roberts would later rejoin Chester as chief scout.

Roberts died on 6 February 2021 aged 84.

References

1936 births
2021 deaths
Welsh footballers
Association football wingers
Footballers from Wrexham
English Football League players
Wrexham A.F.C. players
Aston Villa F.C. players
Welsh football managers
Chester City F.C. managers
Oswestry Town F.C. managers
Association football coaches
Association football scouts